Transportin-3 is a protein that in humans is encoded by the TNPO3 gene.

Function 

TNPO3 is a nuclear import receptor for serine/arginine-rich (SR) proteins, including Serine/arginine-rich splicing factor 1, which are essential precursor-mRNA splicing factors.

Clinical significance 

The TNPO3-IRF5 locus is implicated in primary biliary cirrhosis and systemic sclerosis.

References

Further reading